Phyllidia rueppelii is a species of sea slug, a dorid nudibranch, a shell-less marine gastropod mollusk in the family Phyllidiidae.

Distribution 
This species was described from the Red Sea. It has been reported from the Gulf of Oman.

References

Further reading
 Brunckhorst, D.J. 1993. The Systematics and Phylogeny of Phyllidiid Nudibranchs (Doridoidea). Australian Museum, Sydney, Australia.

Phyllidiidae
Gastropods described in 1869